Pill Hill is a National Register of Historic Places district southwest of downtown Rochester, Minnesota. The neighborhood encompasses many old houses built on a limestone bluff for staff of the nearby Mayo Clinic, which led to the name.

The boundaries of Pill Hill are roughly 3rd and 9th Streets and 7th and 10th Avenues Southwest. More generally the neighborhood is found between U.S. 52, U.S. 63 (Broadway), Memorial Parkway, and 2nd Street SW. Saint Mary's Hospital is at the bottom of the hill to the north of the district.

In 1990, the neighborhood was added to the National Register of Historic Places. Several buildings on Pill Hill are individually listed, including the Plummer House and the Mayo Foundation House.

References

 

Houses on the National Register of Historic Places in Minnesota
Historic districts on the National Register of Historic Places in Minnesota
Houses in Olmsted County, Minnesota
Buildings and structures in Rochester, Minnesota
National Register of Historic Places in Olmsted County, Minnesota